Edwards Township may refer to the following places in the United States:

 Edwards Township, Michigan
 Edwards Township, Kandiyohi County, Minnesota

Township name disambiguation pages